Star Without Light (French: Étoile sans lumière) is a 1946 French drama film directed by Marcel Blistène and starring Édith Piaf, Marcel Herrand and Jules Berry. The film's art direction was by Jean d'Eaubonne. The film is set in 1929.

Main cast
 Édith Piaf as Madeleine  
 Marcel Herrand as Roger Marney  
 Jules Berry as Billy Daniel 
 Serge Reggiani as Gaston Lansac  
 Mila Parély as Stella Dora 
 Yves Montand as Pierre 
 Colette Brosset as Lulu  
 Renée Dennsy as La script-girl  
 Jean Raymond as Paul 
 Pierre Farny 
 Paul Frankeur as Le reporter 
 Pierre Mindaist 
 Ginette Cantrin 
 Juliette Cransac 
 Georges Yvon 
 Jean Rozemberg 
 Georges Vitray as Le producteur Darnois 
 Mady Berry as Mélanie

References

Bibliography 
 Gorlinski, Gini. The 100 Most Influential Musicians of All Time. Britannica Educational Publishing, 2009.

External links 
 

1946 films
1946 drama films
French drama films
1940s French-language films
Films set in 1929
Films directed by Marcel Blistène
French black-and-white films
1940s French films